A halfback, half back, or half-back may refer to:

 , in rugby league football
 , in rugby league football
 Half-back (rugby union)
 Fly-half (rugby union) 
 Scrum-half (rugby union)
 Half back (association football), an obsolete position
 Centre-back
 Wing half
 Halfback (American football), a type of running back
 Halfback (Canadian football), a type of defensive back
 Half-back line, in Australian rules football

See also
Fullback (disambiguation)
Quarterback
Three-quarter back